Teffichthys is an extinct genus of ray-finned fish from the Early Triassic epoch. Fossils have been found in Madagascar and China, and possibly also in Angola, Canada, Greenland, and Svalbard.

Classification
The type species of Teffichthys is Perleidus madagascariensis from the Induan of Madagascar. Perleidus is a Middle Triassic genus; Early Triassic species were referred to this genus based on superficial similarities. In 2017, the genus Teffichthys was erected for "Perleidus" madagascariensis, and the second species from Madagascar ("Perleidus" piveteaui) was synonymized with Teffichthys madagascariensis. Other Early Triassic species currently ascribed to Perleidus might be referrable to Teffichthys, too. 

A phylogenetic analysis placed Teffichthys as a stem-neopterygian closely related to Meidiichthys and Plesiofuro.

References

  

Prehistoric neopterygii
Prehistoric ray-finned fish genera
Triassic bony fish
Prehistoric fish of Africa
Triassic fish of Europe
Triassic fish of North America